Aisha Steel Mills Limited (ASML) is a Karachi-based steel manufacturing company with production capacity of 220,000 metric tons per year. It is owned by Arif Habib Group.

Its plant is located at Bin Qasim, Karachi and produces at a capacity of 220,000 metric tons per year.

History 
Aisha Steel Mills was founded in 2005 as a joint venture between Arif Habib Group, Metal One Corporation, a subsidiary of Mitsubishi and Universal Metal One, one of the world's largest steel trading companies.

In 2012, it had an initial public offering (IPO) and was oversubscribed by 2.7 times. In the same year, the company started commercial operations.

In 2017, under China-Pakistan Economic Corridor (CPEC) agreement between the governments of China and Pakistan, Aisha Steel Mills like other major steel producers in Pakistan, is preparing to meet the expected increase in steel supply demands related to the upcoming infrastructure projects in Pakistan.

References

External links
 Official website

Steel companies of Pakistan
Manufacturing companies based in Karachi
Pakistani companies established in 2005
Manufacturing companies established in 2005
Companies listed on the Pakistan Stock Exchange
2012 initial public offerings